Vohiposa is a town and commune in Madagascar. It belongs to the district of Ambohimahasoa, which is a part of Haute Matsiatra Region. The population of the commune was estimated to be approximately 16,000 in 2001 commune census.

Primary and junior level secondary education are available in town. The majority 90% of the population of the commune are farmers.  The most important crops are rice and peanuts, while other important agricultural products are beans and maize. Industry and services provide employment for 2% and 8% of the population, respectively.

References and notes 

Populated places in Haute Matsiatra